Wang Xizhi (303 AD361 AD) was a Chinese calligrapher, politician, general and writer during the Jin dynasty. He was best known for his mastery of Chinese calligraphy. Wang is sometimes regarded as the greatest Chinese calligrapher in Chinese history, and was a master of all forms of Chinese calligraphy, especially the running script. He is known as one of the Four Talented Calligraphers in Chinese calligraphy. Emperor Taizong of Tang admired his works so much that Wang's work, the Preface to the Poems Composed at the Orchid Pavilion (or Lantingji Xu) was said to be buried with the emperor in his mausoleum.

His artistic talent continues to be held in high esteem in modern China, and remains an influential figure in East Asian calligraphy, particularly Japanese calligraphy.

Biography
Born in Linyi, Langya Commandery (modern Linyi, Shandong), Wang belonged to the powerful and prominent Wang clan of Langya. In his youth, the War of the Eight Princes and subsequent invasions of the Five Barbarians led to turmoil in northern China and the Western Jin's collapse; as such the ten-year-old Wang Xizhi moved south with his clan, and spent most of his life in present-day Shaoxing and Wenzhou of modern-day Zhejiang province. 

Wang Xizhi is particularly remembered for one of his hobbies, that of rearing geese. Legend has it that he learned that the key to how to turn his wrist whilst writing was to observe how geese moved their necks. He loved geese very much. He looked at the geese splashing in the river in a daze. Later, he comprehended the principle of calligraphy from the movements of the geese, which helped his calligraphy skills. There is a small porcelain cup depicting Wang Xizhi "walking geese" in the China Gallery of the Asian Civilisations Museum in Singapore. The other side of the cup depicts a scholar "taking a zither to a friend". 

He used to practice writing near a pond, and when he finished, he would wash his brush and ink-stone in the pond. Over time, the water of the whole pond turned black. This shows how much effort he has made into practicing calligraphy.

When the emperor of the time went to the northern suburbs for sacrifice, he asked Wang Xizhi to write the words of blessing on a piece of wood and  send workers to carve it. The engraver was shocked because Wang Xizhi's handwriting penetrated more than a third of the wood. He said admiringly "the character of the general of the right army is "Ru mu san fen", which is used to describe strong and powerful calligraphy works, and also to describe a thorough understanding of things. 

Wang Xizhi had seven children, all of whom were notable calligraphers. The most distinguished was his youngest son, Wang Xianzhi.

Works 
He learned the art of calligraphy from Lady Wei Shuo. He excelled in every script but was particularly skilled in semi-cursive script. His representative works include, in chronological order, Narration on Yue Yi , The Yellow Court Classic, Commentaries on the Portrait of Dongfang Shuo, Admonitions to the Emperor from the Imperial Mentor, Preface to the Collection of Poems Composed at the Orchid Pavilion (also commonly known as Lantingji Xu), and The Statement of Pledge (告誓文).  Unfortunately, none of his original works remains today, and only models of them exist. Samples of Wang's handwriting can also be seen in classical Chinese calligraphic texts such as the Chunhua Imperial Archive of Calligraphy Exemplars (淳化閣帖).
His most well-known work, Lantingji Xu, is an introduction to a collection of poems written by several poets during a gathering at Lanting (near the town of Shaoxing) for the Spring Purification Festival. The original is now lost, but the work survives in a number of finely traced copies, with the earliest and most well regarded copy being the one made between c. 627650 by Feng Chengsu, and is located in the Palace Museum in Beijing.

In 2010, a small Tang dynasty reproduction of one of Wang's calligraphy scrolls on silk with four lines was sold in China at an auction for ¥308 million RMB ($48 million).

Mei Zhi Tie 
"Mei Zhi Tie", is a copy featuring 17 characters written by Wang Xizhi. The name came from the word "meizhi" at the beginning of the article. It was first exhibited in 1973 at the "Showa Lanting Memorial Exhibition". The work does not include inscriptions and collection marks.

It was exhibited by the "Chinese and Japanese Calligraphy Treasures Exhibition" on March 12, 2006 in Shanghai.

References

Footnotes

Works cited
 
 Li, Siyong, "Wang Xizhi". Encyclopedia of China (Chinese Literature Edition), 1st ed.
 Khoo Seow Hwa and Penrose, Nancy L, Behind the Brushstrokes: Tales from Chinese Calligraphy. Singapore: Graham Brash, 1993.

External links

 Animation of Wang's Calligraphy AniGraphy by Marion Tzui Yan. broken link
 Wang Xizhi and his Calligraphy Gallery at China Online Museum
 Wang XiZhi's calligraphy
 Selections of Wang Xi Zhi by Professor Lu-sheng Chong
 
 
 The Orchid Pavilion by Wang Xizhi.

303 births
361 deaths
4th-century Chinese calligraphers
4th-century Chinese writers
Artists from Shaoxing
East Asian calligraphy
Jin dynasty (266–420) politicians
Jin dynasty (266–420) calligraphers
Politicians from Shaoxing
Writers from Shaoxing